Philip Benjamin Neil Frederick Parkes (born 8 August 1950, Sedgley, Staffordshire, England) is a former football goalkeeper.

Early life
Phil Parkes grew up in Monument Lane, Sedgley, and was a pupil at nearby Dormston School.

Football career
Beginning his football career at Walsall, turning professional in 1968, he made over 50 appearances in the Black Country before moving to London, signing for Queens Park Rangers for £15,000 in June 1970. His QPR debut was on Saturday 22 August 1970 in a 3–1 defeat at home to Leicester City.

Parkes was part of the QPR team that reached the last eight of the FA Cup in 1974 and were League runners-up to Liverpool in 1976. Many observers consider that side, managed by Dave Sexton, the finest team never to have won the League. His club career at QPR spanned 344 league appearances (406 in all competitions). He gained his only England cap during this period, against Portugal in 1974.

Parkes was sold to West Ham United in 1979 for £565,000, a world record for a goalkeeper at the time. It is reported that Sexton, who by then was manager of Manchester United, put in six bids for the player but saw them all turned down. It was only the half-million-pound bid from West Ham United that QPR chairman Jim Gregory could not resist. Upon John Lyall's signing of Parkes, it was thought that he was a huge risk due to the severity of the condition of his knees, but his signing was to pay off as Parkes was to remain first choice keeper for the next ten years. Despite this longevity, however, he only ever gained one piece of silverware, when West Ham beat Arsenal 1–0 to win the 1980 FA Cup Final.

Parkes appeared as himself in Thunderbolt and Smokey! in the boys' comic Eagle in 1982, giving a coaching session to a schoolboy striker who was having to play in goal in a cup semi-final due to the regular keeper being injured.

Although Parkes collected just one major trophy during his long playing career, his time at Upton Park saw him come close to picking up honours more than once later on in the 1980s. He was on the losing side in the 1981 Football League Cup Final against Liverpool, the same year that he collected a Second Division title medal as the Hammers returned to the First Division after three years away. In 1983–84, the Hammers were in the title race mid season but fell away to finish ninth. They re-emerged as title challengers in 1985–86 and were in the hunt for the title right up to the end of April, finally finishing third. He also helped them reach the League Cup semi-finals in 1988–89, but it was a disappointing season for the Hammers who were then relegated to the Second Division. Parkes had sat out much of the season, despite new signing Allen McKnight making many mistakes, before Parkes was finally reinstated as first choice. Parkes finished his West Ham career having played exactly the same number of league games for them as he had for QPR – 344.

Parkes is the only footballer ever to have played in excess of 300 matches for two different English league clubs.

In 1990, he left the Hammers on a free transfer after 11 years and linked up with John Lyall, who had returned to management at Ipswich Town. He played three league games in 1990–91 and moved into coaching.

In 2003, an official West Ham United members poll for the greatest West Ham XI named him as the team's goalkeeper, beating Ludek Miklosko to that position. He is considered by QPR supporters to be one of the three best goalkeepers in the club's history, the others being Reg Allen and David Seaman.

Parkes had great ability, and was unfortunate to only ever win one England cap. He would have won a second soon after his first as, during a game against Wales in 1976, the manager Don Revie said Parkes would play the second half, but at half-time with the score still at 0–0 Revie decided to keep Ray Clemence on. After the game, Parkes went home and said to his wife he would never make himself available for England again.

Honours
West Ham United
Football League Second Division: 1980–81
FA Cup: 1980

Individual
PFA Team of the Year: 1979–80 Second Division, 1980–81 Second Division
West Ham United Hammer of the Year: 1980–81

Personal life
In 2014, Parkes received treatment for Dukes stage A bowel cancer.

References

External links

1950 births
Living people
England B international footballers
England under-23 international footballers
England under-21 international footballers
England international footballers
English footballers
Association football goalkeepers
Ipswich Town F.C. players
Sportspeople from Dudley
Queens Park Rangers F.C. players
Walsall F.C. players
West Ham United F.C. players
Queens Park Rangers F.C. non-playing staff
English Football League players
Association football goalkeeping coaches
FA Cup Final players